The Dardic languages (also Dardu or Pisaca) or Hindu-Kush Indo-Aryan languages,  are a group of several Indo-Aryan languages spoken in northern Pakistan, northwestern India and parts of northeastern Afghanistan.

The term "Dardic" is only a geographic convention used to denote the northwesternmost group of Indo-Aryan languages rather than any ethnic or linguistic basis. There is no ethnic unity among the speakers of these languages nor can the languages can be traced to a single ancestor.

The languages and peoples are often referred to as Kohistani, mostly by the Pashtuns and also by themselves.

History
Early British efforts placed almost all the peoples and languages of the upper Indus River between Kashmir and Kabul into one unitary group, coining the distinct identities of all other peoples in the region, resulting in the formation of terms such as Dard, Dardistan, and Dardic.

No people in the region refer to themselves as Dards, their country as Dardistan, or their language as Dardic. The word Dard itself is unknown in any languages of the area, except as a loan word from Persian via Urdu, in which it means "pain". The broad application of this term have been criticised by many scholars.

In a historic context, Herodotus (4th century B.C.), in one of his stories, mentioned a war-like people by the name of Dadikai on the frontier of India. Much later, Strabo and Pliny mentioned the war-like people Dardae. Alexander, whose travels provide much of the data for classical geography of the subcontinent, did not meet any Dard people, but he did go to a place called Daedala, where he was reported to have fought against people called Assakenoi. Herodotus Dadikai appears to be the Persian name derived from the Daradas given in the Puranic sources. Rather than a specific people, they were referred to characterize a fierce people, residing in the northwest, outside the boundaries of civilization. Kalhana, in Rajatarangini, mentions the Darads as residing to the north of Kashmir, and as frequently attempting to invade and loot Kashmir.

The term later became accepted through repeated usage. G.W. Leitner coined the terms Dard and Dardistan, even though the name 'Dard' was not claimed by any people in the region. John Biddulph, who spent many years in Gilgit, also stated the name Dard was not acknowledged by any section of the tribes to whom it was commonly applied. Biddulph recognized Leitner's term Dardistan as founded on a misconception, but accepted the term as a convenient way of designating the difficult, diverse, and largely unknown Karakoram between Kashmir and the Hindukush Range. This usage of the term is curiously parallel to the Sanskrit usage, where it connoted nonspecific ferocious outsiders living in the mountains beyond the borders of the region.

Leitner's Dardistan, in its broadest sense, became the basis for the classification of the languages in the north-west of the Indo-Aryan linguistic area (which includes present-day eastern Afghanistan, northern Pakistan, and Kashmir). George Abraham Grierson, with scant data, borrowed the term and proposed an independent Dardic family within the Indo-Iranian languages. However, Grierson's formulation of Dardic is now considered to be incorrect in its details, and has therefore been rendered obsolete by modern scholarship.

Georg Morgenstierne, who conducted an extensive fieldwork in the region during the early 20th century, revised Grierson's classification and came to the view that only the "Kafiri" (Nuristani) languages formed an independent branch of the Indo-Iranian languages separate from Indo-Aryan and Iranian families, and determined that the Dardic languages were unmistakably Indo-Aryan in character.Due to their geographic isolation, many Dardic languages have preserved archaisms and other features of Old Indo-Aryan. These features include three sibilants, several types of clusters of consonants, and archaic or antiquated vocabulary lost in other modern Indo-Aryan languages.

Kalasha and Khowar are the most archaic of all modern Indo-Aryan languages, retaining a great part of Sanskrit case inflexion, and retaining many words in a nearly Sanskritic form. For example at’hi "bone" in Kalasha is nearly identical to asthi in Sanskrit and ašrú "tear" in Khowar is identical to the Sanskrit word.

French Indologist Gérard Fussman points out that the term Dardic is geographic, not a linguistic expression. Taken literally, it allows one to believe that all the languages spoken in Dardistan are Dardic. It also allows one to believe that all the people speaking Dardic languages are Dards and the area they live in is Dardistan. A term used by classical geographers to identify the area inhabited by an indefinite people, and used in Rajatarangini in reference to people outside Kashmir, has came to have ethnographic, geographic, and even political significance today.

Classification

George Morgenstierne's scheme corresponds to recent scholarly consensus. As such, Dardic's position as a legitimate genetic subfamily has been repeatedly called into question; it is widely acknowledged that the grouping is more geographical in nature, as opposed to linguistic. Indeed, Buddruss rejected the Dardic grouping entirely, and placed the languages within Central Indo-Aryan. Other scholars, such as Strand and Mock, have similarly voiced doubts in this regard.

However, Kachru contrasts "Midland languages" spoken in the plains, such as Punjabi and Urdu, with "Mountain languages", such as Dardic. Kogan has also suggested an 'East-Dardic' sub-family; comprising the 'Kashmiri', 'Kohistani' and 'Shina' groups.

The case of Kashmiri is peculiar. Its Dardic features are close to Shina, often said to belong to an eastern Dardic language subfamily. Kachru notes that "the Kashmiri language used by Kashmiri Hindu Pandits has been powerfully influenced by Indian culture and literature, and the greater part of its vocabulary is now of Indian origin, and is allied to that of Sanskritic Indo-Aryan languages of northern India".

While it is true that many Dardic languages have been influenced by non-Dardic languages, Dardic may have also influenced neighbouring Indo-Aryan lects in turn, such as Punjabi, the Pahari languages, including the Central Pahari languages of Uttarakhand, and purportedly even further afield. Some linguists have posited that Dardic lects may have originally been spoken throughout a much larger region, stretching from the mouth of the Indus (in Sindh) northwards in an arc, and then eastwards through modern day Himachal Pradesh to Kumaon. However, this has not been conclusively established.

Subdivisions
Dardic languages have been organized into the following subfamilies:

 Eastern Dardic languages:
 Kashmiri languages: Kashmiri, Poguli, Kishtwari;
 Shina languages: Shina, Brokskat, Kalkoti, Kohistani Shina, Kundal Shahi, Palula, Savi, Ushoji;
 Kohistani languages: Maiya (Indus Kohistani), Bateri, Chilisso, Gowro, Kalami, Tirahi, Torwali, Wotapuri-Katarqalai, Mankiyali
Chitrali languages: Kalasha (Urtsuniwar), Khowar
Pashayi languages
Kunar languages: Dameli, Gawar-Bati, Nangalami (Grangali), Shumashti

Characteristics

Loss of voiced aspiration
Virtually all Dardic languages have experienced a partial or complete loss of voiced aspirated consonants. Khowar uses the word buum for 'earth' (Sanskrit: bhumi), Pashai uses the word duum for 'smoke' (Hindi: dhuan, Sanskrit: dhum) and Kashmiri uses the word dod for 'milk' (Sanskrit: dugdha, Hindi: dūdh). Tonality has developed in most (but not all) Dardic languages, such as Khowar and Pashai, as a compensation. Punjabi and Western Pahari languages similarly lost aspiration but have virtually all developed tonality to partially compensate (e.g. Punjabi kar for 'house', compare with Hindi ghar).

Dardic metathesis and other changes
Both ancient and modern Dardic languages demonstrate a marked tendency towards metathesis where a "pre- or postconsonantal 'r' is shifted forward to a preceding syllable". This was seen in Ashokan rock edicts (erected 269 BCE to 231 BCE) in the Gandhara region, where Dardic dialects were and still are widespread. Examples include a tendency to spell the Classical Sanskrit words priyadarshi (one of the titles of Emperor Ashoka) as instead priyadrashi and dharma as dhrama. Modern-day Kalasha uses the word driga 'long' (Sanskrit: dirgha). Palula uses drubalu 'weak' (Sanskrit: durbala) and brhuj 'birch tree' (Sanskrit: bhurja). Kashmiri uses drolid 'impoverished' (Sanskrit: daridra) and krama 'work' or 'action' (Sanskrit: karma). Western Pahari languages (such as Dogri), Sindhi and Lahnda (Western Punjabi) also share this Dardic tendency to metathesis, though they are considered non-Dardic, for example cf. the Punjabi word drakhat 'tree' (from Persian darakht).

Dardic languages also show other consonantal changes. Kashmiri, for instance, has a marked tendency to shift k to ch and j to z (e.g. zon 'person' is cognate to Sanskrit jan 'person or living being' and Persian jān 'life').

Verb position in Dardic
Unlike most other Indo-Aryan (or Iranian) languages, several Dardic languages present "verb second" as the normal grammatical form. This is similar to many Germanic languages, such as German and Dutch, as well as Uto-Aztecan O'odham and Northeast Caucasian Ingush. Most Dardic languages, such as Indus Kohistani, however, follow the usual Indo-Iranian subject-object-verb (SOV) pattern, similar to Japanese.

See also
Indo-Aryan languages
Nuristani languages

Notes
1.The Khowar word for 'earth' is more accurately represented, with tonality, as buúm rather than buum, where ú indicates a rising tone.
2.The word drolid actually includes a Kashmiri half-vowel, which is difficult to render in the Urdu, Devnagri and Roman scripts alike. Sometimes, an umlaut is used when it occurs in conjunction with a vowel, so the word might be more accurately rendered as drölid.
3.Sandhi rules in Sanskrit allow the combination of multiple neighboring words together into a single word: for instance, word-final 'ah' plus word-initial 'a' merge into 'o'. In actual Sanskrit literature, with the effects of sandhi, this sentence would be expected to appear as Eṣá ékóśvósti. Also, word-final 'a' is Sanskrit is a schwa,  (similar to the ending 'e' in the German name, Nietzsche), so e.g. the second word is pronounced . Pitch accent is indicated with an acute accent in the case of the older Vedic language, which was inherited from Proto-Indo-European.
4.Hindi-Urdu, and other non-Dardic Indo-Aryan languages, also sometimes utilize a "verb second" order (similar to Kashmiri and English) for dramatic effect. Yeh ek ghoṛā hai is the normal conversational form in Hindi-Urdu. Yeh hai ek ghoṛā is also grammatically correct but indicates a dramatic revelation or other surprise. This dramatic form is often used in news headlines in Hindi-Urdu, Punjabi and other Indo-Aryan languages.

Sources

Academic literature from outside South Asia
 Morgenstierne, G. Irano-Dardica. Wiesbaden 1973;
 Morgenstierne, G. Die Stellung der Kafirsprachen. In Irano-Dardica, 327-343. Wiesbaden, Reichert 1975
 Decker, Kendall D. Sociolinguistic Survey of Northern Pakistan, Volume 5. Languages of Chitral.

Academic literature from South Asia

 The Comparative study of Urdu and Khowar. Badshah Munir Bukhari National Language Authority Pakistan 2003. [No Reference]
 National Institute of Pakistani Studies, Quaid-i-Azam University & Summer Institute of Linguistics

Further reading
Khan, Sawar, et al. "Ethnogenetic analysis reveals that Kohistanis of Pakistan were genetically linked to west Eurasians by a probable ancestral genepool from Eurasian steppe in the bronze age." Mitochondrion 47 (2019): 82-93.

References

Bibliography